A Pesar de Todo (All the Same) is the fourth album recorded by Puerto Rican salsa singer Víctor Manuelle released on June 3, 1997. Under the record label of Sony Discos, Sony Tropical, and distributed by Sony Music Entertainment, this album signifies the consecration of Víctor Manuelle. It contains outstanding songs such as "Dile A Ella", "Así Es La Mujer" composed and written by Omar Alfano, "El Aguila" including the most successful single from the album "He Tratado" composed by Manuelle himself. considered by salsa music experts, a flagship song of Salsa romantica.

Background 
After finishing recording his first successful album Victor Manuelle which was his first album to enter the Billboard Lists. The Puerto Rican singer recorded with this album with the hope that it would be more successful than the previous one, which he achieved, leaving hits and classics such as "He Tratado", "Dile A Ella" and "Asi Es La Mujer".

Track listing
This information adapted from Allmusic.

Chart performance

Certification

References

1997 albums
Víctor Manuelle albums